Meir Obernik (1764 – 6 November 1805) was a writer and Biblical commentator of the Biurist movement.

Obernik contributed to the Me'assef a great number of fables, and was one of the most active of the Biurists. He translated into German the Books of Joshua and Judges, adding a short commentary (bi'ur), and (with ) the Book of Samuel. The translation of the whole Tanakh, with the bi'ur, was edited by Obernik under the title of Minḥah ḥadashah (Vienna, 1792–1806).

References
 

1764 births
1805 deaths
19th-century Jewish biblical scholars
19th-century translators
Hebrew–German translators
Jewish translators of the Bible
People of the Haskalah
Translators of the Bible into German